Edsel Ford was the son of Henry Ford and president of Ford Motor Company.

Edsel Ford may also refer to:

 Edsel, a failed brand of Ford Motor Company
 Edsel Ford (poet) (1928–1970), American poet
 Edsel Ford II (born 1948), American businessman and great-grandson of Henry Ford
 Edsel Ford High School, Dearborn, Michigan
 Edsel Ford Freeway, a section of Interstate 94 in Detroit, Michigan

See also
 Edsel and Eleanor Ford House, Grosse Pointe Shores, Michigan, on the National Register of Historic Places
 Edsel Ford Fong (1927–1984), famously rude American waiter